Chris Manderino (born December 22, 1982) is a former American football fullback. He was originally signed by the Cincinnati Bengals as an undrafted free agent in 2006.

Early years
Manderino was born on December 22, 1982 in Anaheim, California. He scored a school and district record 31 touchdowns in his senior year earning him league MVP honors, and his 2,200 career rushing yards were the second-best recorded in school history. Manderino also participated in the Orange County All-Star Game and the L.A. vs. Orange County All-Star Game.

Manderino's father, Paul played defensive end and fullback at Michigan State University.

College career

Mandirino was redshirted in 2001, and played college football as the starting fullback for the California Golden Bears from 2002 to 2005.

Professional career

Kansas City Chiefs
Manderino was released by the Kansas City Chiefs during the final roster cuts in August 2008.

Bologna Doves
Manderino signed with the Bologna Doves, an Italian football team in 2009 where he excelled as a running back and linebacker.  He then coached the Doves' junior team for their 2009 season.  Manderino documented his time abroad in a blog.

Post-Retirement

LYFE Fuel and Plant-based Diet Advocacy

Following his retirement, Manderino studied dietary nutrition and sports training theory, becoming an advocate for a plant-based lifestyle. Manderino launched the LyfeFuel brand of plant-protein drinks and supplements in 2016.

References

External links
California Golden Bears bio
Cincinnati Bengals bio
Kansas City Chiefs bio
LYFE Fuel

1982 births
Living people
Plant-based diet advocates
Players of American football from Anaheim, California
American football fullbacks
California Golden Bears football players
Cincinnati Bengals players
Kansas City Chiefs players